Netzwerk is the German word for "network".

It may also refer to:
 Netzwerk (film), a 1969 German film
 Netzwerk (album), an album by the electronic duo Klangkarussell
 Netzwerk (Falls Like Rain), a song by Klangkarussell released in the album Netzwerk
 Netzwerk (band), an Italian Eurodance band

See also 
 Network (disambiguation)